UFC on ESPN: Reyes vs. Weidman (also known as UFC on ESPN 6) was a mixed martial arts event produced by the Ultimate Fighting Championship that took place on October 18, 2019 at the TD Garden in Boston, Massachusetts.

Background 
A light heavyweight bout between Dominick Reyes and former UFC Middleweight Champion Chris Weidman served as the event headliner.

A featherweight bout between Zabit Magomedsharipov and Calvin Kattar was scheduled to take place at this event. However, in mid-September promotion officials elected to reschedule the pairing for "UFC Fight Night: dos Santos vs. Volkov", which was later retitled to UFC Fight Night: Magomedsharipov vs. Kattar.  The fight was moved for undisclosed reasons.

A middleweight bout between Brendan Allen and Eric Spicely was scheduled for the event. However, Spicely was forced to withdraw from the event due to an undisclosed reason. He was replaced by Kevin Holland.

At the weigh-ins, Deron Winn and Manny Bermudez missed the required weight for their respective fights. Winn weighed in at 188.5 pounds, 2.5 pounds over the middleweight non-title fight limit of 186. Bermudez weighed in at 148 pounds, 2 pounds over the featherweight non-title fight limit of 146. Both bouts were held at a catchweight. Winn and Bermudez were fined 20% of their purse, which went to their opponents Darren Stewart and Charles Rosa respectively.

Results

Bonus awards
The following fighters received $50,000 bonuses.
 Fight of the Night: Yair Rodríguez vs. Jeremy Stephens   
Performance of the Night: Dominick Reyes and Charles Rosa

See also 

 List of UFC events
 2019 in UFC
 List of current UFC fighters

References 

UFC on ESPN
2019 in Boston
2019 in mixed martial arts
2019 in sports in Massachusetts
Events in Boston
October 2019 sports events in the United States
Mixed martial arts in Massachusetts
Sports competitions in Boston